Karl Selter (24 June 1898 in Koeru, Estonia – 31 January 1958 in Geneva, Switzerland) was an Estonian politician and a Minister of Foreign Affairs of Estonia.  He served as Minister of Economic Affairs from 1933 to 1938 and as minister of Foreign affairs from 1938 to 1939.  His historically most memorable act was to sign a non-aggression and mutual assistance treaty with the Soviet leaders in Moscow in September 1939.  This was also his personal and national Estonian most tragic act. It followed a brutal ultimatum from the Soviet Foreign Minister, Vyacheslav Molotov on 24 September. Molotov said to Setler: Estonia gained sovereignty when the Soviet Union was powerless, but you “don’t think that this can last… forever… The Soviet Union is now a great power whose interests need to be taken into consideration. I tell you—the Soviet Union needs enlargement of her security guarantee system; for this purpose she needs an exit to the Baltic Sea … I ask you, do not compel us to use force against Estonia.” The enforced in this manner treaty gave the Soviet army a right to set up military bases in Estonia, and it significantly reduced Estonia's independence until Estonia was formally incorporated into the Soviet Union between June and August 1940.  Selter left Estonia in November 1939, resigning both as Foreign Minister and as a member of Parliament.  He moved to Geneva, Switzerland as a diplomat. After Germany occupied Estonia between 1941 and 1944, and after it was re-incorporated into the Soviet Union in 1944, he stayed in Switzerland as an exiled diplomat and politician.

References

1898 births
1958 deaths
People from Järva Parish
People from the Governorate of Estonia
Patriotic League (Estonia) politicians
Ministers of Foreign Affairs of Estonia
Finance ministers of Estonia
Government ministers of Estonia
Members of the Estonian National Assembly
Members of the Riigivolikogu
Envoys of Estonia
University of Tartu alumni
Estonian military personnel of the Estonian War of Independence
Recipients of the Military Order of the Cross of the Eagle, Class I
20th-century Estonian politicians